Jiao Shuai (焦帥, born 28 January 1984 in Zhengzhou, Henan) is a retired male Chinese volleyball player. He was part of the bronze medal-winning team at the 2006-2007 National League.

He competed for Team China at the 2008 Summer Olympics in Beijing.

He is the head coach of Henan Women's Volleyball Club now.

References

Profile

External links
 profile at FIVB.org

1984 births
Living people
Olympic volleyball players of China
People from Zhengzhou
Volleyball players at the 2008 Summer Olympics
Volleyball players from Henan
Volleyball players at the 2010 Asian Games
Chinese men's volleyball players
Asian Games competitors for China
21st-century Chinese people